Lloyd Charles Larsen (born in Monticello, Utah) is an American politician and a Republican member of the Wyoming House of Representatives representing District 54 since January 8, 2013.

Elections
2012 When Republican Representative Del McOmie retired and left the District 54 seat open, Larsen won the three-way August 21, 2012 Republican Primary with 978 votes (51.5%), and won the three-way November 6, 2012 General election with 2,787 votes (55.3%) against Democratic nominee Bruce Palmer and Libertarian candidate Ryan Jones, who had sought the seat in 2010 as a Republican.

References

External links
Official page at the Wyoming Legislature
 

Year of birth missing (living people)
Living people
Republican Party members of the Wyoming House of Representatives
People from Monticello, Utah
People from Sweetwater County, Wyoming
21st-century American politicians